Silvestriapyx is a genus of diplurans in the family Japygidae.

Species
 Silvestriapyx greeni (Silvestri, 1930)

References

Diplura